Norton Branch may refer to:

Norton Branch (Kentucky), a stream
Norton Branch, Kentucky, an unincorporated community